Greenspun (Anglicized from ) is a surname. Notable people with the surname include:

 Hank Greenspun (1909–1989), American newspaper publisher, and founder of the Greenspun Corporation
 Philip Greenspun (born 1963), American computer scientist and entrepreneur
 Roger Greenspun, American journalist and film critic

See also 
Greenspan
Greenspoon
Greenspun Media Group
Greenspun's Tenth Rule
The Greenspun Corporation
Grinspun
Grünspan

Jewish surnames
Yiddish-language surnames